Hrvoje Vlašić (born July 16, 1969) is a Croatian professional basketball coach for HKK Posušje, who play in the Basketball Championship of Bosnia and Herzegovina.

Coaching career
In the beginning of his coaching career Vlašić worked with teams from Croatia such as Dubrava and Kvarner, and from Bosnia and Herzegovina such as Posušje, Široki Eronet and Čapljina Lasta. During 2004–05 season, he coached Šibenka Dalmare in their only Adriatic League season in the history. 

On November 28, 2011, Vlašić became the head coach of the Šibenik-based team Jolly Jadranska Banka. On February 4, 2013, he was fired by the Jolly Šibenik. On August 23, 2013, he was hired to be the head coach of the Zadar. It was his second term as Zadar head coach. Also, he briefly coached Zadar's team during 2001–02 season.

On August 4, 2016, he was hired to be the head coach of the Mostar-based team Zrinjski. On July 10, 2018, he signed a new two-year deal for Zrinjski.

On July 18, 2022, he became the head coach of Bosnian Basketball Championship team HKK Posušje.

Career achievements
 Bosnian League champion: 2  (with Široki TT Kabeli: 2008–09; with Zrinjski: 2017–18)

References

External links
 Vlasic ABA League profile

1969 births
Living people
Croatian basketball coaches
KK Zadar coaches
Sportspeople from Zadar
KK Dubrava coaches
KK Šibenik coaches